Sergio Amidei (30 October 1904 – 14 April 1981) was an Italian screenwriter and an important figure in Italy's neorealist movement.

Amidei was born in Trieste. He worked with famed Italian directors such as  Roberto Rossellini and Vittorio De Sica.  He was nominated for four Academy Awards: in 1946 for Rome, Open City, in 1947 for Shoeshine, in 1949 for Paisà and in 1961 for Il generale della Rovere. In 1963 he was a member of the jury at the 3rd Moscow International Film Festival. In 1975 he was a member of the jury at the 9th Moscow International Film Festival. The city of Gorizia has established an international recognition dedicated to him, which rewards the best film screenwriters annually.

He died in Rome.

Selected filmography
 Don Bosco (1935)
 Pietro Micca (1938)
 The Count of Brechard (1938)
 The Night of Tricks (1939)
 Then We'll Get a Divorce (1940)
 The Prisoner of Santa Cruz (1941)
 The Last Dance (1941)
 Jealousy (1942)
 The Taming of the Shrew (1942)
 Don Cesare di Bazan (1942)
 The Queen of Navarre (1942)
 Farewell Love! (1943)
 Harlem (1943)
 The Son of the Red Corsair (1943)
 Sad Loves (1943)
 The Priest's Hat (1944)
 Crime News (1947)
 Pact with the Devil (1950)
 Paris Is Always Paris (1951)
 The Machine That Kills Bad People (1952)
The President of Borgorosso Football Club (1970)

References

External links

1904 births
1981 deaths
Burials at Campo Verano
Mass media people from Trieste
20th-century Italian screenwriters
David di Donatello winners
Italian male screenwriters
20th-century Italian male writers